The Mystery Squadron (aka Mystery Squadron) is a 1933 American pre-Code 12-chapter Mascot film serial, directed by Colbert Clark and David Howard. The film was produced by Nat Levine, and stars Western star Bob Steele, Guinn "Big Boy" Williams, Lucile Browne, Purnell Pratt and Jack Mulhall. The Mystery Squadron made an impressive use of a great deal of aerial footage to enliven the action.

Plot
At an air show, ace flyers Fred Cromwell (Bob Steele) and his partner, Bill "Jelly Bean" Cook (Guinn "Big Boy" Williams) perform aerial feats that prove they are the greatest aviators around. A dam being built by Stephen Gray (Lafe McKee), the owner of a construction firm, comes under attack from the mysterious pilot, the "Black Ace", and his "Mystery Squadron" of pilots. With Gray facing financial ruin, he asks Henry Davis (Jack Mulhall), the dam's foreman and ex-stunt pilot to hire Fred and Bill.

The identity of the Black Ace is so secret that it is even concealed from his own men in the Mystery Squadron. Fred and his partner, Bill seek to unmask the Black Ace and stop his attacks on Gray's power dam. The Mystery Squadron is headquartered in a secret cave near the dam.
 
A rich gold mine is threatened by the dam's construction and a number of individuals behave suspiciously, including Lafe Johnson (Purnell Pratt), a rival contractor, Martin (Edward Peil, Sr.), the hotel owner, Collins (J. Carrol Naish), a construction employee for Gray and Dr. Flint (Robert Frazer). When the Mystery Squadron strikes again, Fred finds Davis tied up in his car. Davis explains he has been held captive by the raiders.

Fred and Bill finally confront Davis with evidence that he is the Black Ace. Davis panics and takes off in his aircraft only to be shot down by Fred and his partner.

Cast

 Bob Steele as Fred Cromwell, old stunt pilot friend of Henry Davis
 Guinn "Big Boy" Williams as Bill "Jellybean" Cook, old stunt pilot friend of Henry Davis
 Lucile Browne as Dorothy Gray
 Jack Mulhall as Henry Davis, dam foreman and ex-stunt pilot
 Purnell Pratt as Lafe Johnson
 Robert Frazer as Dr Flint
 J. Carrol Naish as Collins
 Edward Peil, Sr. as Martin
 Bob Kortman as Bracken
 Lafe McKee as Stephen Gray

Production
Up to four Travel Air 2000s, commonly known as the "Wichita Fokker", a popular aircraft used in Hollywood features, were used in various aerial sequences. Most of the attacks by air, however, were shot with miniatures on diorama sets.

Stunts
Yakima Canutt
George Magrill

Reception
Hans J. Wollstein in his review of The Mystery Squadron wrote, "... Mystery Squadron contains many well-made aerial fights and stunts but is also filled with all kinds of silly and seemingly unnecessary gaffes. When a dart carrying a warning note is thrown through a window, for example, that same window is shown in the following shot as not only securely closed but covered by an undamaged lace curtain." and ".. (Williams') supposedly comical craving for jellybeans quickly becomes tiring."

Chapter Titles

 The Black Ace
 The Fatal Warning
 The Black Ace Strikes
 Men of Steel
 The Death Swoop
 Doomed
 Enemy Signals
 The Canyon of Calamity
 The Secret of the Mine
 Clipped Wings
 The Beast at Bay
 The Ace of Aces 
Source:

See also
Bob Steele filmography
 List of film serials by year
 List of film serials by studio

References

Notes

Citations

Bibliography

 Cline, William C. "3. The Six Faces of Adventure". In the Nick of Time. Jefferson, North Carolina: McFarland & Company, Inc., 1984. .
 Cline, William C. "Filmography". In the Nick of Time. Jefferson, North Carolina: McFarland & Company, Inc., 1984. .
 Harmon, Jim and Donald F. Glut. The Great Movie Serials: Their Sound and Fury. London: Routledge, 1973. .
 Weiss, Ken and Ed Goodgold. To be Continued ...: A Complete Guide to Motion Picture Serials. New York: Bonanza Books, 1973. .
 Wynne, H. Hugh. The Motion Picture Stunt Pilots and Hollywood's Classic Aviation Movies. Missoula, Montana: Pictorial Histories Publishing Co., 1987. .

External links
 
 
 

1933 films
1933 adventure films
American aviation films
American black-and-white films
1930s English-language films
Mascot Pictures film serials
Films directed by David Howard
Films produced by Nat Levine
American adventure films
1930s American films